"Psycho" is a song recorded by Australian singer-songwriter Amy Shark featuring Mark Hoppus of Blink-182. The song was released on 22 June 2018, as an album pre-order track, and as the third single from Shark's debut studio album Love Monster.

Speaking to Beats 1's Zane, Lowe Hoppus said he met Shark in Los Angeles and she asked him to work on something together, to which he agreed. Hoppus said “Amy had this great idea for a song and for me it was a lot easier than working with a lot of other artist because her music is so sparse. A lot of times it's just her and a guitar, so even just her an acoustic guitar and maybe a beat behind it. My job was really easy, I just had to not over add stuff to kill the idea that she already had.”

Reception
Madelyn Tait from The Music Au, in an album review, called the song the album highlight, saying "The stripped-back, mostly acoustic duet is sweet and has a slight pop-punk feel, and their voices nicely complement each other as they sing about love over fingerpicked, intertwining guitars and crashing drums."

Cameron Adams from Herald Sun, in an album review, said the song "builds to a classy crescendo."

Track listing
 "Psycho"  - 3:26

Charts

Certifications

Release history

References
 

2018 singles
Amy Shark songs
Sony Music Australia singles
Australian pop rock songs
Songs written by Mark Hoppus
Songs written by Amy Shark